The 21st Cavalry Division was a division of the United States Army National Guard located in the north eastern United States. The division was composed of personnel from the New York, New Jersey, Pennsylvania and Rhode Island Army National Guards.

The division was created from the perceived need for additional cavalry units after the First World War.  It numbered in succession of the Regular Army Divisions, which were not all active at its creation.

History
The division was constituted in 1921 and assigned to the First Army.  Not all authorized units were active during the division's lifetime.  The division did not participate in the First Army maneuvers in 1935, 1939, and 1940.  The 21st was inactivated on 1 October 1940 and disbanded on 1 November 1940. The division staff personnel were reassigned to the serve as the Brigade Staff for the 102nd Coast Artillery Brigade (Anti-Aircraft) and the Headquarters Battery was manned by personnel from the division headquarters troop and the 51st Cavalry Brigade. Major General Nathaniel Hillyer Egleston (New York Army National Guard) gave up command of the 21st and assumed command of the 102nd on 5 September 1940.

Organization

Headquarters, New York City, New York
Headquarters Troop, West New Brighton, New York
51st Cavalry Brigade, New York
Headquarters Troop, Staten Island, New York
101st Cavalry Regiment (New York National Guard), Brooklyn, New York 
121st Cavalry Regiment (New York National Guard), Rochester, New York 
59th Cavalry Brigade, Newark, New Jersey
Headquarters Troop, Newark, New Jersey
102d Cavalry Regiment (New Jersey National Guard), Newark, New Jersey 
110th Cavalry Regiment (Massachusetts National Guard), Boston, Massachusetts 
112th Field Artillery Regiment, Trenton, New Jersey 
Headquarters Special Troops, West New Brighton, New York
21st Signal Troop, West New Brighton, New York
125th Ordnance Company, (Medium), Connecticut
21st Tank Company (Light), New York
21st Reconnaissance Squadron, Boston, Massachusetts
125th Engineer Squadron, New York
121st Medical Squadron, New York
121st Quartermaster Squadron, Boston, Massachusetts

See also
United States Army branch insignia
List of armored and cavalry regiments of the United States Army
Headquarters Troop, 51st Cavalry Brigade Armory 
New York Army National Guard Heraldry

References

U.S. Army Order of Battle 1919–1941, Volume 2. The Arms: Cavalry, Field Artillery, and Coast Artillery, 1919–41 by Lieutenant Colonel (Retired) Steven E. Clay, Combat Studies Institute Press, Fort Leavenworth, Kansas, 2011
Maneuver and Firepower, The Evolution of Divisions and Separate Brigades, by John B. Wilson, Center of Military History, Washington D.C., 1998
Cavalry Regiments of the U S Army by James A. Sawicki Wyvern Pubns; June 1985
'', The Trading Post, Journal of the American Society of Military Insignia Collectors, April- June 2009, pages 20 & 21

External links
Formations of the United States Army

21
Military units and formations established in 1921
Military units and formations disestablished in 1940